Matthew George Manning (born January 28, 1998) is an American professional baseball pitcher for the Detroit Tigers of Major League Baseball (MLB). The Tigers selected him in the first round of the 2016 MLB draft.

Amateur career
Manning attended Sheldon High School in Sacramento, California. He played baseball and basketball in high school, and considered dropping baseball to focus on basketball after his freshman year. He began to focus on his pitching in his junior year. By his senior year, when he had a 1.91 earned run average (ERA) and 77 strikeouts in  innings pitched, his fastball could reach . He committed to attend Loyola Marymount University to play college baseball and college basketball.

Professional career
The Detroit Tigers selected Manning with the ninth overall selection of the 2016 Major League Baseball draft. Manning signed with the Tigers rather than attend college, receiving a $3,505,800 signing bonus, the exact slot value for the ninth overall pick. After signing, the Tigers assigned Manning to the Gulf Coast Tigers of the Rookie-level Gulf Coast League, where he posted a 0–2 win–loss record with a 3.99 ERA in ten games started, pitching no more than three innings per start.

In 2017, Manning began the season in extended spring training, and spent time with both the Connecticut Tigers of the Class A-Short Season New York-Penn League and the West Michigan Whitecaps of the Class A Midwest League, pitching to a combined 4–2 record and 3.18 ERA in 14 total starts between both teams. In 2018, he played for West Michigan, the Lakeland Flying Tigers of the Class A-Advanced Florida State League, and the Erie SeaWolves of the Class AA Eastern League. He represented the Tigers at the 2018 All-Star Futures Game, striking out fellow Tigers' prospect Dawel Lugo. Manning had a 7–8 record with a 3.29 ERA and a 1.20 walks plus hits per innings pitched ratio in 22 total starts between the three clubs. He returned to Erie to begin 2019. Manning was named to the 2019 All-Star Futures Game. On August 28, Manning was named the 2019 Eastern League Pitcher of the Year. At the time of earning the honor, he had an 11–5 record with a 2.56 ERA while also leading the league in strikeouts (148) and WHIP (0.98). His ERA and batting average against (.192) were also tied for second-best in the league.

On January 16, 2020 he was a non-roster invitee of the Detroit Tigers to Spring Training before the season was postponed due to the coronavirus. The Tigers added him to their 40-man roster after the year.

On June 15, 2021, it was announced that Manning would be promoted to the major leagues for the first time and make his MLB debut on June 17 as the starting pitcher against the Los Angeles Angels. In his debut, Manning pitched five innings, allowing two runs and striking out three, while taking the loss. In his next start on June 23, his home debut for the Tigers, Manning earned his first major league win over the St. Louis Cardinals, allowing two runs over  innings.

Manning started the 2022 season in the Tigers rotation. On April 20, he was placed on the 10-day IL due to right shoulder inflammation, retroactive to April 17. Due to suffering a setback in one of his rehab starts, Manning did not return to the Tigers until making a start against the Minnesota Twins on August 2. On August 24, Manning pitched six shoutout innings with a career-high eight strikeouts in a win over the San Francisco Giants.

Personal life
Manning is the son of Rich Manning, who played in the National Basketball Association. His older brother, Ryan, played basketball for the Air Force Falcons and his younger brother, Jake, plays volleyball at Georgetown College.

References

Further reading

External links

Perfect Game

1998 births
Living people
Baseball players from Sacramento, California
Major League Baseball pitchers
Detroit Tigers players
Gulf Coast Tigers players
Connecticut Tigers players
West Michigan Whitecaps players
Lakeland Flying Tigers players
Erie SeaWolves players
Toledo Mud Hens players